Crambus johnsoni is a moth in the family Crambidae. It was described by Alexander Barrett Klots in 1942. It is found in the US states of New Mexico and Arizona.

The length of the forewings is 12–15 mm. The ground color of the forewings is greenlish-brassy brown, paler towards the inner margin. The hindwings are gray brown, paler towards the anal margin.

Etymology
The species is named for Ranger John W. Johnson of the U.S. Forest Service.

References

Crambini
Moths described in 1942
Moths of North America